Nandu may refer to:

Places
 Nandu River, Hainan province, China

Other uses 
 Ñandú, a native South American name for any of three species of Rhea.
 Nandu (film), a 1981 Tamil film
 Ñandú (vehicle), a 1940s all-terrain vehicle military vehicle
 Southern Metropolis Daily, often shortened to Nandu (南都)
 One of the Argentine Air Force flights that attacked the British fleet in the Battle of San Carlos, during the Falklands War, 1982

People with the given name
 Nandu Bhende (c. 1955–2014), Indian singer
 Nandu M. Natekar (1933–2021), Indian badminton player

See also
 Nandhu (born 1965), Malayalam film actor